Kevin James Gallagher (22 January 1926 — 20 August 2019) was an Australian rules footballer who played for the Norwood Football Club in the South Australian National Football League (SANFL) and also represented South Australia in interstate football.

His son Philip also played for Norwood.

References 

1926 births
2019 deaths
Australian rules footballers from South Australia
Norwood Football Club players